Pinosylvin is an organic compound with the formula C6H5CH=CHC6H3(OH)2.  A white solid, it is related to trans-stilbene, but with two hydroxy groups on one of the phenyl substituents. It is very soluble in many organic solvents, such as acetone.

Occurrence
Pinosylvin is produced in plants in response to fungal infections, ozone-induced stress, and physical damage for example. It is a fungitoxin protecting the wood from fungal infection. It is present in the heartwood of Pinaceae and also found in Gnetum cleistostachyum.

Injected in rats, pinosylvin undergoes rapid glucuronidation and a poor bioavailability.

Biosynthesis 
Pinosylvin synthase, an enzyme, catalyzes the biosynthesis of pinosylvin from malonyl-CoA and cinnamoyl-CoA:
3 malonyl-S-CoA + cinnamoyl-S-CoA  →  4 CoA-SH  +  pinosylvin  +  4 CO2

This biosynthesis is noteworthy because plant biosyntheses employing cinnamic acid as a starting point are rare compared to the more common use of p-coumaric acid. Two other compounds produced from cinnamic acid are anigorufone and curcumin.

References 

Stilbenoids